Karin Evers-Meyer (born 10 September 1949) is a German politician of the Social Democratic Party (SPD).

Political career 
A former journalist and author, Evers-Meyer was first elected member of the German Bundestag in the 2002 federal elections.

Between 2005 and 2009, Evers-Meyer – herself a mother of a child with disabilities – served as the Federal Government Commissioner for Matters relating to Disabled Persons (at the Federal Ministry of Labour and Social Affairs) in the second cabinet of Chancellor Angela Merkel. Ahead of the 2009 elections, German foreign minister Frank-Walter Steinmeier included her in his shadow cabinet of 10 women and eight men for the Social Democrats' campaign to unseat Merkel as chancellor.

Following the 2009 federal elections, Evers-Meyer was appointed the SPD parliamentary group's deputy spokesperson on defense policy. A member of the Budget Committee since the 2013 elections, she served as the group's rapporteur on the budget of the Federal Ministry of Defense (BMVg). In addition, she was a member of the German delegation to the NATO Parliamentary Assembly, led by Karl A. Lamers.

In the negotiations to form a coalition government following the 2013 federal elections, Evers-Meyer was part of the SPD delegation in the working group on foreign affairs, defense policy and development cooperation, led by Thomas de Maizière and Frank-Walter Steinmeier.

In July 2016, Evers-Meyer announced that she would not stand in the 2017 federal elections but instead resign from active politics by the end of the parliamentary term.

Political positions

Relations with the African continent 
Evers-Meyer has in the past voted in favor of German participation in United Nations peacekeeping missions as well as in United Nations-mandated European Union peacekeeping missions on the African continent, such as in Somalia – both Operation Atalanta (2009, 2010, 2011, 2014 and 2015) and EUTM Somalia (2014, 2015 and 2016) –, Darfur/Sudan (2010, 2011, 2012, 2013 and 2014), South Sudan (2011, 2012, 2013 and 2014), Mali – both EUTM Mali (2014 and 2015) and MINUSMA (2014 and 2015) –, the Central African Republic (2014), and Liberia (2015). In 2013, she abstained from the votes on extending the mandate for participation in EUTM Somalia and EUTM Mali, and she voted against the participation in Operation Atalanta in 2012 and 2013.

Other activities 
 Association of the German Army (FKW), Member of the Presidium
 Federal Academy for Security Policy (BAKS), Member of the Advisory Board (since 2015)
 EWE AG, Member of the Supervisory Board (2002–2005)
 EWE Stiftung, Member of the Board (2002–2012)

References

External links 

 
 Biography of German Bundestag

1949 births
Living people
People from Friesland (district)
German Lutherans
German women writers
German women journalists
Members of the Bundestag for Lower Saxony
21st-century German women politicians
Members of the Bundestag 2013–2017
Members of the Bundestag 2009–2013
Members of the Bundestag 2005–2009
Members of the Bundestag 2002–2005
Members of the Bundestag for the Social Democratic Party of Germany